Georgia sent a delegation to compete at the 2008 Summer Paralympics in Beijing, People's Republic of China. The country was represented by a single athlete who competed in powerlifting.

Powerlifting

Men

See also
Georgia at the Paralympics
Georgia at the 2008 Summer Olympics

External links
International Paralympic Committee

References

Nations at the 2008 Summer Paralympics
2008
Summer Paralympics